The Salford Symphony Orchestra (SSO) is one of the major amateur orchestras in North West England. It is also one of the oldest, celebrating its 70th year in 2017. It is based at Salford, in Greater Manchester, England. Joseph Needham founded Salford Symphony Orchestra in 1947.

Concerts are given four times a year, usually in the Peel Hall of the University of Salford, sometimes with professional soloists. The current Musical Director is Chris Clark.

External links
Salford Symphony Orchestra website

British symphony orchestras
English orchestras
Music in Salford
Musical groups established in 1947
1947 establishments in England
Musical groups from Greater Manchester